The Swift Current Broncos are a junior ice hockey team in the Western Hockey League. Founded during 1967 in Swift Current, Saskatchewan, the Broncos played seven seasons before relocating to Lethbridge from 1974 to 1986 as the Lethbridge Broncos. The Broncos then returned to Swift Current, and have played there since 1986, at the Innovation Credit Union iPlex.

History
The Broncos started out as the Swift Current Broncos in Swift Current, Saskatchewan, but moved to Lethbridge in 1974. The team had been losing money in tiny Swift Current and the new Lethbridge Sportsplex was beckoning for a team. The Broncos played in Lethbridge for twelve seasons, winning the President's Cup in 1982–83. In the mid-1980s, the team came up for sale, and despite a large and loyal fanbase in Lethbridge, the Broncos were bought by local interests in Swift Current and moved back to their original home. After a year without WHL hockey in Lethbridge, the Calgary Wranglers moved to the city and became the Lethbridge Hurricanes.

The Broncos won its only Memorial Cup championship two years later at the 1989 Memorial Cup. In the 1993 Memorial Cup, the Broncos were eliminated in a tie-breaker. Afterwards, head coach Graham James resigned to coach the Calgary Hitmen, but three seasons later, allegations arose that he sexually abused former player Sheldon Kennedy during their days together with the Broncos. James was convicted of sexual offenses and sentenced to three years in prison.

The Broncos play in the second smallest market in the Canadian Hockey League. The only market smaller than Swift Current is Bathurst, New Brunswick, home of the QMJHL's Acadie-Bathurst Titan.

1986 team bus crash

On December 30, 1986, the Broncos' bus crashed on the way to a game in Regina. Four players: Trent Kresse, Scott Kruger, Chris Mantyka and Brent Ruff (younger brother of Lindy Ruff) were killed. The team still wears a commemorative patch in remembrance of the four players. The rest of the team, led by future NHL star Joe Sakic, who recorded 60 goals, played out the season despite the loss.  In a move to memorialise the fallen players, the WHL now awards the Four Broncos Memorial Trophy to the League's Player of the Year.

Season-by-season record

First Broncos (1967–74)

Note: GP = Games played, W = Wins, L = Losses, T = Ties, Pts = Points, GF = Goals for, GA = Goals against

Second Broncos (1986–present)
Note: GP = Games played, W = Wins, L = Losses, T = Ties, OTL = Overtime losses, Pts = Points, GF = Goals for, GA = Goals against

WHL Championship history
1988–89: Win, 4–0 vs Portland
1992–93: Win, 4–3 vs Portland
2017–18: Win, 4–2 vs Everett

Current roster
Updated January 11, 2023.

 

 

 

  

 

 

 

 

 

 

 
 

 

 

 

|}

Team records

NHL alumni

Retired numbers:
The Swift Current Broncos have retired the jersey numbers of the four players who died in the aforementioned 1986 team bus accident.
8 Trent Kresse
9 Scott Krueger
11 Brent Ruff
22 Chris Mantyka

Coaches

Graham James 1986–87 to 1993–94
Todd McLellan 1994–95 to 1999–2000
Brad McEwen 2000–01 to 2002–03
Randy Smith 2003–04
Dean Chynoweth 2004–05 to 2008–09
Mark Lamb 2009–10 to 2015–16
Emanuel Viveiros 2016–17 to 2017–18
Dean Brockman 2018–19 to 2021
Devan Praught 2021–present

See also
 List of ice hockey teams in Saskatchewan
 Swift Current Broncos (SJHL)

References

External links
 Swift Current Broncos official website

Ice hockey teams in Saskatchewan
Western Hockey League teams
Ice hockey clubs established in 1967
Swift Current
1967 establishments in Saskatchewan